Begonia pelargoniiflora is a species of plant in the family Begoniaceae. It is found in Cameroon and Equatorial Guinea. Its natural habitat is subtropical or tropical moist lowland forests. It is threatened by habitat loss.

References

pelargoniiflora
Critically endangered plants
Taxonomy articles created by Polbot